SS Robert Lansing was a Liberty ship built in the United States during World War II. She was named after Robert Lansing, a Counselor of the United States Department of State and United States Secretary of State under Woodrow Wilson.

Construction
Robert Lansing was laid down on 3 June 1943, under a Maritime Commission (MARCOM) contract, MC hull 1531, by J.A. Jones Construction, Panama City, Florida; she was launched on 17 July 1943.

History
She was allocated to Moore-McCormack Lines, Inc., on 6 August 1943. On 5 June 1948, she was laid up in the National Defense Reserve Fleet, in Wilmington, North Carolina. On 24 March 1967, she was sold for $48,071 to Union Minerals and Alloys Corporation, for scrapping. She was removed from the fleet on 7 April 1967.

References

Bibliography

 
 
 
 

 

Liberty ships
Ships built in Panama City, Florida
1943 ships
Wilmington Reserve Fleet